Putrivka is a village in the Fastiv Raion, Kyiv Oblast, Ukraine. It belongs to Hlevakha settlement hromada, one of the hromadas of Ukraine. The village has a population of 1,567.

Until 18 July 2020, Putrivka belonged to Vasylkiv Raion. The raion was abolished that day as part of the administrative reform of Ukraine, which reduced the number of raions of Kyiv Oblast to seven. The area of Vasylkiv Raion was split between Bila Tserkva, Fastiv, and Obukhiv Raions, with Putrivka being transferred to Fastiv Raion.

References

Villages in Fastiv Raion